Dougherty is a city in Cerro Gordo County, Iowa, United States. The population was 62 at the 2020 census. It is part of the Mason City Micropolitan Statistical Area.

History
A post office called Dougherty has been in operation since 1900. Dougherty was named for a local farmer.

Geography
Dougherty is located at  (42.922381, -93.041194).

Demographics

2010 census
As of the census of 2010, there were 58 people, 29 households, and 18 families living in the city. The racial makeup of the city was 96.6% White and 3.4% Asian.

There were 29 households, of which 10.3% had children under the age of 18 living with them, 55.2% were married couples living together, 3.4% had a female householder with no husband present, 3.4% had a male householder with no wife present, and 37.9% were non-families. 31.0% of all households were made up of individuals, and 13.8% had someone living alone who was 65 years of age or older. The average household size was 1.90 and the average family size was 2.33.

The median age in the city was 51.7 years. 8.6% of residents were under the age of 18; 6.8% were between the ages of 18 and 24; 13.8% were from 25 to 44; 46.5% were from 45 to 64; and 24.1% were 65 years of age or older. The gender makeup of the city was 46.6% male and 53.4% female.

2000 census
As of the census of 2000, there were 80 people, 37 households, and 19 families living in the city. The racial makeup of the city was 96.25% White, 2.50% Native American, and 1.25% from two or more races.

There were 37 households, out of which 29.7% had children under the age of 18 living with them, 45.9% were married couples living together, 2.7% had a female householder with no husband present, and 48.6% were non-families. 48.6% of all households were made up of individuals, and 27.0% had someone living alone who was 65 years of age or older. The average household size was 2.11 and the average family size was 3.11.

In the city, the population was spread out, with 22.5% under the age of 18, 5.0% from 18 to 24, 23.8% from 25 to 44, 28.8% from 45 to 64, and 20.0% who were 65 years of age or older. The median age was 44 years. For every 100 females, there were 105.1 males. For every 100 females age 18 and over, there were 113.8 males.

The median income for a household in the city was $36,458, and the median income for a family was $50,417. Males had a median income of $23,750 versus $30,893 for females. The per capita income for the city was $19,569. There were no families and 4.2% of the population living below the poverty line, including no under eighteens and none of those over 64.

Education
Dougherty is part of the West Fork Community School District, formed in 2011 by the merger of SCMT (Sheffield–Chapin–Meservey–Thornton) Community School District and the Rockwell–Swaledale Community School District.

References

Cities in Cerro Gordo County, Iowa
Cities in Iowa
Mason City, Iowa micropolitan area